The Andrew Olle Media Lecture was established in 1996 by the presenters and staff at 702 ABC Sydney (formerly 2BL) to honour the memory of ABC Radio and television broadcaster Andrew Olle, who died in 1995 of a brain tumour. It focuses on the role and future of the media.

Lecturers
The Andrew Olle Lecturers have been:
 1996: David Williamson, Australian playwright
 1997: Jana Wendt, Australian television journalist
 1998: John Alexander, former editor-in-chief of The Australian Financial Review and The Sydney Morning Herald
 1999: Steve Vizard, Australian writer and producer, chairman Granada Australia
 2000: Eric Beecher, chief executive of Text Media, former editor of The Sydney Morning Herald
 2001: Kerry Stokes, executive chairman of the Seven Network
 2002: Lachlan Murdoch, chairman of News Limited, deputy chief operating officer of News Corporation
 2003: Harold Mitchell, CEO and chairman of Mitchell Partners
 2004: Chris Anderson,  board member of Publishing and Broadcasting Limited, former chief executive of Optus
 2005: John Doyle, Australian actor, comedian, writer
 2006: Senator Helen Coonan, Minister for Communications, Information Technology and the Arts
 2007: John Hartigan, chairman and chief executive of News Limited
 2008: Ray Martin, Australian television journalist
 2009: Julian Morrow, Australian actor, comedian, member of The Chaser
 2010: Alan Rusbridger, editor of The Guardian newspaper, media innovator
 2011: Laurie Oakes, Australian print and television journalist
 2012: Mark Colvin, Australian radio journalist
 2013: Lisa Wilkinson, presenter of Today, former Cleo editor
 2014: Kate McClymont, investigative journalist for The Sydney Morning Herald
 2015: Helen McCabe, editor-in-chief of The Australian Women's Weekly magazine
 2016: Waleed Aly, writer, commentator, broadcaster, academic and co-host of The Project
 2017: Joseph Kahn, managing editor of The New York Times
 2018: Caroline Wilson, former chief football writer of The Age
 2019: Peter FitzSimons, author & columnist for The Sydney Morning Herald
 2020–21: Not Held due to the COVID-19 pandemic.
 2022: Ita Buttrose, current ABC Chair, author & founding editor of Cleo

References

Olle
1996 establishments in Australia
Australian journalism organisations